John Nightingale may refer to:

John Nightingale (academic) (born 1960), British academic
John Nightingale (actor) (1942–1980), British actor
John Nightingale (figure skater) (born 1928), American figure skater
John Nightingale (police officer) (1913–2002), British police officer
Jack Nightingale (1899–1967), full name John Gladstone Nightingale, English footballer